Satanella may refer to:

Books
Satanella, one of the pen names of Austrian writer Ada Christen (1839-1901)
Across Europe with Satanella, book by motorbike traveller Clare Sheridan

Film and theatre
Satanella Amarante company, Portugal, founded by Luisa Satanela, in which António Silva (actor) and others performed
Herzogin Satanella, 1921 Austrian film directed by Michael Curtiz
Satanella, lead role played by María Martín in La mano della morta; see Hand of Death (1949 film)

Music and dance
Satanella (ballet), 1848 revision by Marius Petipa of Le Diable amoureux (ballet) 1840
"Satanella pas de deux", added to ballet 1859 Cesare Pugni
Satanella (Balfe), 1858 opera
Satanella, opera by Emil von Reznicek
Satanela also Satanella, 1898 Czech opera by Josef Richard Rozkošný
Satanella, 1863 comic opera by Augustus Glossop Harris
"Satanella-Polka", Op.124 Johann Strauss, II 
"Satanella-Quadrille", Op.123 Johann Strauss, II

Transport
Satanella (ship), Welsh pleasure steamer in accident with SS Fenella (1881)
Satanella, nickname of an AJS motorcycle, the first British motorcycle in the Soviet Union Clare Sheridan

Science
Sideridis satanella a species of moth; see Sideridis
Megasis satanella, a species of snout moth in the genus Megasis